Jack Sieg was an American swimmer who used the butterfly stroke in 1935, developed by his coach David (aka Dave) Armbruster. He competed for the University of Iowa and first used the stroke in a breaststroke leg of a medley relay February 25, 1935.

See also
History of swimming

References

American male butterfly swimmers
American male breaststroke swimmers
Living people
American male swimmers
Year of birth missing (living people)
20th-century American people